The Live Music Act 2012 (c 2) is an Act of the Parliament of the United Kingdom. The Act reduces regulation surrounding live music in small venues, allowing venues with a capacity below  200 people to host live music between 8am and 11pm without the need to apply for a licence. The audience limit has now been extended to 500 people.

References

https://www.gov.uk/guidance/entertainment-licensing-changes-under-the-live-music-act

United Kingdom Acts of Parliament 2012
2012 in British music